Marcus Williams (born July 29, 2002) is an American college basketball player for the San Francisco Dons of the West Coast Conference (WCC). He previously played for the Wyoming Cowboys and Texas A&M Aggies

High school career
Williams played basketball for Dickinson High School in Dickinson, Texas as a freshman. He transferred to Clear Springs High School in League City, Texas for his sophomore season to play with his older brother, Faite. After the season, Williams returned to Dickinson but was ruled ineligible to play for the varsity team, moving down to junior varsity. As a senior, he averaged 21.4 points, 7.3 assists, 3.9 rebounds and 3.3 steals, helping his team achieve a 32–5 record, win the Region III-6A title and advance to its first state tournament in 65 years. Williams shared District 24-6A MVP honors with his teammate, Tramon Mark. He originally signed a National Letter of Intent to play college basketball for Northern Colorado under head coach Jeff Linder. He switched his commitment to Wyoming after Linder was hired there.

College career
On December 9, 2020, Williams scored a freshman season-high 30 points for Wyoming in an 83–61 win over Denver. On March 10, 2021, he recorded 15 points, 10 assists, seven steals and six rebounds in a 111–80 first round victory over San Jose State at the Mountain West tournament. As a freshman, Williams averaged 14.8 points and 4.3 assists per game. He was named Mountain West Freshman of the Year and to the Third Team All-Mountain West. Following the season, Williams transferred to Texas A&M. He averaged 7.9 points, 3.4 assists, 2.2 rebounds, and 1.3 steals per game. For his junior season, Williams transferred to San Francisco.

Career statistics

College

|-
| style="text-align:left;"| 2020–21
| style="text-align:left;"| Wyoming
| 25 || 24 || 31.1 || .452 || .330 || .705 || 2.5 || 4.3 || 1.4 || .2 || 14.8

Personal life
Williams' older brother, Faite, plays college basketball for Prairie View A&M.

References

External links
San Francisco Dons bio
Texas A&M Aggies bio
Wyoming Cowboys bio

2002 births
Living people
American men's basketball players
Basketball players from Texas
People from Dickinson, Texas
Point guards
San Francisco Dons men's basketball players
Texas A&M Aggies men's basketball players
Wyoming Cowboys basketball players